Saint-Georges-de-Reneins is a commune in the Rhône department in eastern France. It is part of the canton of Gleizé and the arrondissement of Villefranche-sur-Saône.

Geography 
The altitude of the commune of Saint-Georges-de-Reneins ranges between 167 and 244 meters. The area of the commune is 27.49 km2. The town lies 35 km north of Lyon and 8 km south of Villefranche-sur-Saône.

See also
Communes of the Rhône department

References

Communes of Rhône (department)
Beaujolais (province)
Segusiavi